John Brantley Hightower (May 23, 1933 – July 6, 2013) was a director of the Museum of Modern Art, the South Street Seaport Museum, and the Mariners' Museum.

Biography
Hightower was born in Atlanta, Georgia and moved with his family to New York City, New York when he was one. He attended the Northfield Mount Hermon School, a private boarding school in Massachusetts.  He graduated Yale University in 1955.  He served two years in the Marines after graduation.  From 1957 to 1961 he was in an executive training program at First National City Bank.  In 1961 he became an assistant to the president and publisher of American Heritage Publishing Company.

He was executive director of the New York State Council on the Arts from 1964 to 1970 where his budget went from $500,000 his first year to $22 million his last year.

On May 1, 1970, he assumed the position of director of the Museum of Modern Art. Hightower's tenure at the museum was marked by the unionizing of its work force into the Professional and Administrative Staff Association (PASTA) which also went on strike. He resigned from his position on January 5, 1972.

From 1977 to 1993 he was president of the South Street Seaport Museum

From 1993 to 2006 he was president and Director of the Mariners' Museum, a period which included establishing the USS Monitor Center and Conservation Laboratory.

References

1933 births
2013 deaths
People from Atlanta
Yale University alumni
Directors of museums in the United States
People associated with the Museum of Modern Art (New York City)
People from New York City
South Street Seaport
Northfield Mount Hermon School alumni